Thomas Johansson defeated Marat Safin in the final, 3–6, 6–4, 6–4, 7–6(7–4) to win the men's singles tennis title at the 2002 Australian Open. Johansson became the first Swede to win the title since Mats Wilander in 1988.

Andre Agassi was the two-time reigning champion, but did not participate due to a wrist injury.

The 2002 edition of the Australian Open marked the first time that the top two seeds lost in the first round, and the first such occurrence at any major since the 1990 French Open. Top seed Lleyton Hewitt lost to Alberto Martín, while second seed Gustavo Kuerten lost to Julien Boutter.

Seeds
The seeded players are listed below. Thomas Johansson is the champion; others show the round in which they were eliminated.

Qualifying

Draw

Finals

Top half

Section 1

Section 2

Section 3

Section 4

Bottom half

Section 5

Section 6

Section 7

Section 8

External links
 Association of Tennis Professionals (ATP) – 2002 Australian Open Men's Singles draw
 2002 Australian Open – Men's draws and results at the International Tennis Federation

Mens singles
Australian Open (tennis) by year – Men's singles